Estela Rodríguez Villanueva (November 17, 1967 – April 10, 2022) was a Cuban judoka. She won silver medals at the 1992 and  1996 Summer Olympics, both in the Half Heavyweight (over 72 kg) category.  She returned a positive test to banned diuretic drug called furosemide at the 1996 Olympics, but was only issued with a reprimand, and allowed to keep her medals. Rodríguez died in Havana on April 10, 2022, at the age of 54.

Notes

References

External links
 

1967 births
2022 deaths
Sportspeople from Santiago de Cuba
Cuban sportspeople in doping cases
Doping cases in judo
Judoka at the 1992 Summer Olympics
Judoka at the 1996 Summer Olympics
Olympic judoka of Cuba
Olympic silver medalists for Cuba
Olympic medalists in judo
Cuban female judoka
Medalists at the 1996 Summer Olympics
Medalists at the 1992 Summer Olympics
Pan American Games gold medalists for Cuba
Pan American Games silver medalists for Cuba
Pan American Games bronze medalists for Cuba
Pan American Games medalists in judo
Judoka at the 1987 Pan American Games
Judoka at the 1991 Pan American Games
Medalists at the 1987 Pan American Games
Medalists at the 1991 Pan American Games
20th-century Cuban women
21st-century Cuban women